The Medina Group is a geologic group in New York. It preserves fossils dating back to the Silurian period. The group includes the Whirlpool Sandstone, Power Glen Shale, Devils Hole Sandstone, Grimsby Formation, Thorold Sandstone, Cambria Shale and Kodak Sandstone.

See also

 List of fossiliferous stratigraphic units in New York

References

Geologic groups of New York (state)